Galleria may refer to

Shopping centres named Galleria

Australia 
Galleria Shopping Centre (Perth), Morley, Western Australia
Galleria Shopping Centre (Melbourne), Melbourne, Victoria

Canada 
Allen Lambert Galleria, Toronto, Ontario
Galleria Shopping Centre (Toronto), Toronto, Ontario
Galleria Mall, London, Ontario

Finland 
Galleria (Espoo shopping centre), Leppävaara, Espoo

India 
 Galleria, Hiranandani Gardens, Powai, Mumbai

Italy 
 Galleria Vittorio Emanuele II, Milan
 Galleria Umberto I, Naples

Japan 
 Galleria of Tokyo Midtown

Korea 
 Galleria Department Store, a franchise owned by Hanwha Group

Philippines 
 Robinsons Galleria, Quezon City
 Robinsons Galleria Cebu, Cebu City
 Robinsons Galleria South, San Pedro, Laguna

South Africa 
 Galleria Shopping Mall, a shopping mall in Amanzimtoti near Durban

Turkey 
 Galleria Adana, Adana
 Galleria Ankara, Ankara
 Galleria Ataköy, Istanbul

United Kingdom 
 The Galleria, Hatfield, Hertfordshire
 Hay's Galleria, Bankside, London

United States (by state) 
 Riverchase Galleria, Birmingham, Alabama
 Galleria at Tyler, Riverside, California
 Glendale Galleria, Glendale, California
 Sherman Oaks Galleria, Sherman Oaks, California: outdoor mall, but formerly enclosed
 South Bay Galleria, Redondo Beach, California
 Westfield Galleria at Roseville, Roseville, California
 The Galleria at Fort Lauderdale, Florida
 Cobb Galleria, Atlanta, Georgia
 Galleria Center, Algonquin, Illinois: outdoor mall
 Galleria (Lexington), Kentucky; proposed in the 1980s but never built
 The Galleria (Metairie, Louisiana)
 CambridgeSide Galleria, Cambridge, Massachusetts
 Silver City Galleria, Taunton, Massachusetts
 Galleria Edina, Edina, Minnesota
 Saint Louis Galleria, St. Louis, Missouri
 Galleria at Sunset, Henderson, Nevada
 Galleria at Crystal Run, Walkill, New York
 Galleria at White Plains, White Plains, New York
 Poughkeepsie Galleria, Poughkeepsie, New York
 Walden Galleria, Cheektowaga, New York
 The Galleria at Erieview, Cleveland, Ohio
 The Johnstown Galleria, Johnstown, Pennsylvania
 Galleria at Pittsburgh Mills, Tarentum, Pennsylvania
 York Galleria, York, Pennsylvania
 Cool Springs Galleria, Franklin, Tennessee
 Wolfchase Galleria, Memphis, Tennessee
 Galleria Dallas, Dallas, Texas
 The Galleria, Houston, Texas
 Tysons Galleria, Tysons Corner, Virginia

Other uses
 Galleria (moth), a snout moth genus containing only the greater wax moth (G. mellonella)
 Galleria degli Uffizi, an art gallery in Florence, Italy
 Galleria Kunstfestival, an art festival in Norway
 The Galleria (Portland, Oregon), a United States mixed-use building (and former shopping mall)

See also
 
 Galleria Mall (disambiguation)
 Gallery (disambiguation)

Italian words and phrases